The Rock 'n' Roll RPMs were a professional wrestling tag team, consisting of Tommy Lane and Mike Davis, that competed in several professional wrestling promotions throughout the Southern United States. They were known for their bright colored tights and hanging bandanas.

History
The Rock 'n' Roll RPMs started in the World Class promotion, which at the time was still affiliated with the National Wrestling Alliance (NWA). They were known for their bright colored tights and hanging bandanas. The Rock 'n' Roll RPMs were glorified for their finishing move "The Spandex Splits". The move was later outlawed due to extensive neck injuries. They had feuds with several teams, including another "Rock 'n' Roll" tag team known as the Rock 'n' Roll Express. The Rock 'n' Roll RPMs went to World Wrestling Council in Puerto Rico and feuded with Ron & Chicky Starr over the WWC World Tag Team Championship. The RPMs feuded with The Fantastics over the WCWA Tag Team Championship, however they were unable to win the championship.

The RPMs also competed in the Continental Wrestling Association (CWA) in Memphis, where they won the American Wrestling Association (AWA)'s Southern Tag Team Championship twice. Teaming with Cactus Jack, the Rock-n-Roll RPMs lost a match against Hector, Chavo, and Mando Guerrero at the only AWA pay-per-view SuperClash III.

After the demise of World Class, Davis and Lane moved on to World Championship Wrestling, where they were used as jobbers. Davis later entered the Global Wrestling Federation, where in 1992, he claimed to have returned to Earth with a "Moon Rock" after he made a bungee jump following a "bungee" match between Chaz Taylor and Steven Dane outside the Dallas Sportatorium.

Aftermath
Mike Davis formed another tag team with his brother Tom Davis known as the Dirty Davis Brothers. He died on December 25, 2001, from a massive heart attack in Granbury, Texas, at the age of 45.

Tommy Lane formed a tag team with "Big" Bobby Jones known as The NEW RPMs for Central All-Star Wrestling.

Championships and accomplishments
 American Wrestling Association
 AWA Southern Tag Team Championship (5 times)
 Championship Wrestling Association
 CWA Tag Team Championship (1 time)
 USA Wrestling
 USA Tag Team Championship (1 time)
 World Wrestling Council
 WWC Tag Team Championship (2 times)

References

American Wrestling Association teams and stables
Independent promotions teams and stables
The Stud Stable members